Manuel James Jemail (September 12, 1893 – July 26, 1978) was a professional American football Quarterback in the National Football League. Born in Byblos, Lebanon, he attended Brown University. He played with the New York Brickley Giants in 1921. He is distinguished as being the first Lebanese to play in the National Football League.

External links
Pro-Football reference
Jimmy Jemail's obituary

1893 births
1978 deaths
People from Byblos
Emigrants from the Ottoman Empire to the United States
Lebanese emigrants to the United States
New York Brickley Giants players
Brown Bears football players
Lebanese players of American football
Sportspeople of Lebanese descent